Zucchi is an Italian surname, and may refer to:

 Ángel Zucchi (born c. 1924), Argentine hockey player
 Antonio Zucchi (1726-1795), Italian painter
 Augusto Zucchi (born 1946), Italian actor and theatre director
 Carlo Zucchi (general) (1777–1863), Italian general and patriot
 Carlo Zucchi (1789–1849), Italian architect
 Dino Zucchi (1927-2011), Italian basketball player
 Francesco Zucchi (1692-1764), Italian engraver
 Franco Zucchi (disambiguation), several people
 Giacomo Zucchi (c.1800–1820), Italian composer in Milan and student of Alessandro Rolla
 Giovanni Zucchi (1931–2021), Italian rower 
 Giuseppe Zucchi (1721-1805), Italian engraver
 Jacopo Zucchi (1541-1590), Florentine painter
 Niccolò Zucchi (1586-1670), Italian Jesuit astronomer and physicist
 Roby Zucchi (born 1951), Italian water-skier noted for slalom
 Thaila Zucchi (born 1981), Italian-English singer and actress
 Virginia Zucchi (1849-1933), Italian ballerina

References

Italian-language surnames